A Hard Name is a 2009 documentary film by Alan Zweig that explores the lives of ex-convicts.

In the film, Zweig interviews seven ex-convicts about their times in prison and their lives on the outside.  The men talk about insights they have gained about their lives, including how childhood abuse led to a life of crime. Film subjects include one man who stabbed fellow inmate Clifford Olson 21 times, before Olson committed his serial killings.

Another of the film's subjects was abused as a child while a resident at the Mount Cashel Orphanage in St. John's, Newfoundland and Labrador. A Hard Name ends with archival television footage of him performing, playing the guitar and singing for other young residents of the home.

Zweig admitted to be intimidated about doing these interviews:

However, the ex-convicts interviewed were surprisingly open to Zweig and allowed themselves to be shown as vulnerable.

Release
A Hard Name premiered May 3, 2009 at the Royal Cinema in Toronto.  The film received the Genie Award for Best Feature Length Documentary at the 30th Genie Awards in 2010. It was also chosen as one of the top ten audience favourites at the Hot Docs Canadian International Documentary Festival.

References

External links

 Producer's webpage for A Hard Name
 Watch A Hard Name at TVOntario Doc Studio website

2009 films
2009 documentary films
Canadian documentary films
Films directed by Alan Zweig
Best Documentary Film Genie and Canadian Screen Award winners
Documentary films about child abuse
Catholic Church sexual abuse scandals in Canada
Canadian prison films
Documentary films about the penal system in Canada
Documentary films about crime in Canada
Crime in British Columbia
Crime in New Brunswick
2000s English-language films
2000s Canadian films